The Roman Catholic Archdiocese of Tyre was an archbishopric in the Kingdom of Jerusalem.

Background 

The See of Tyre was the most prestigious archbishopric under the authority of the patriarchs of Antioch from the 5th century. The archbishops had more than a dozen suffragans, including the bishops of Acre, Beirut, Byblos, Sidon, Tripoli and Tortosa. The crusaders captured Tortosa (now Tartus in Syria) in 1102, Byblos in 1103, and Tripoli in 1109. In the late 1170s, William of Tyre wrote that Bernard of Valence, the Latin Patriarch of Antioch, had soon appointed Latin bishops to the three bishoprics. Documents written in the early 12th century did not refer to the bishops of the three dioceses, suggesting that the three sees, all located in the newly established crusader County of Tripoli, were actually left vacant. After King Baldwin I of Jerusalem captured Sidon and Beirut in 1110, Ghibbelin of Arles, the Latin Patriarch of Jerusalem, convinced Baldwin I to ask Pope Paschal II to place the two sees and also the bishopric of Acre under the jurisdiction of the patriarchs of Jerusalem. Accepting the king's argumentation, the Pope ruled on 8 June 1111 that the boundaries of the ecclesiastical provinces should follow the political frontiers. Patriarch Bernard protested, but the Pope confirmed his decision, emphasizing his right to alter the boundaries of the patriarchates.

Establishment 

Gormond of Picquigny signed a treaty with the Venetians about the joint conquest of Tyre on behalf of Baldwin II of Jerusalem in December 1123. The Patriarch had already consecrated a cleric, Odo, as the archbishop of Tyre, most probably because he wanted to prevent the Latin patriarch of Antioch from appointing his candidate to the see. Odo died before the crusaders and the Venetians captured Tyre on 7 July 1124.

Archbishops 
 Odo ( 1122–1123 or 1124)
 William I ( 1127–1135)
 Fulcher ( 1135–1146)
 Ralph (1146–1150) (elected archbishop, who was not consecrated)
 Peter I (1151–1164)
 Frederick (1164–1174)
 William II (1175–1186) (historian)
 Joscius (1186–1202)
 Clarembaud of Broies (1202–1215)
 Conrad of Krosigk acted as vicar for Clarembaud in 1204–1205
 Simon of Maugastel ( 1216–1229)
 Hugh ( 1231– 1234)
 Peter II of Sargines (1235–1244)
 Nicholas Larcat (1251–1253)
 Gilles (1253–1266)
 John of Saint Maxentius (1267–1272)
 Bonacursus de Gloire (1272–1295)

References

Sources 

 
 
 

Tyre
Medieval Lebanon
Catholic Church in the Middle East

de:Titularerzbistum Tyrus